Nauvoo Township is one of twenty-four townships in Hancock County, Illinois, USA. At the 2010 census, its population was 1,156 and it contained 693 housing units.

Geography

Cities, towns, villages
 Nauvoo (vast majority)

Extinct towns
(These towns are listed as "historical" by the USGS.)
 Quashquema at

Cemeteries
The township contains two cemeteries, Dundey and Smith Family.

Major highways
  Illinois Route 96

Landmarks
 Lovers Glen Park
 Nauvoo State Park

Demographics

School districts
 Nauvoo-Colusa Community Unit School District 325

Political districts
 Illinois's 18th congressional district
 State House District 94
 State Senate District 47

References
 United States Census Bureau 2008 TIGER/Line Shapefiles
 
 United States National Atlas

External links
 City-Data.com
 Illinois State Archives
 Township Officials of Illinois

Townships in Hancock County, Illinois
1849 establishments in Illinois
Townships in Illinois